Vickerman Henzell Rutherford (6 December 1860 – 25 April 1934) was a British Liberal politician and medical doctor.

Education
He was educated at Royal High School, Edinburgh and Sidney Sussex College, Cambridge.

Career
He first stood for parliament at the 1900 General Election as Liberal Party candidate for Osgoldcross. He was then elected Member of Parliament (MP) for Brentford at the 1906 General Election. He was defeated at the January 1910 General election and did not contest the General Election in December 1910. He sought a return to parliament at the 1918 General Election when he stood as Liberal candidate at Bishop Auckland, without the support of the Coalition government 'coupon'. Coalition government endorsement was instead given to another Liberal candidate and as a result Rutherford finished third. He switched his support to the Labour Party and contested the 1920 by-election in Sunderland and finished second.

Electoral record

References

External links 
 

1860 births
1934 deaths
UK MPs 1906–1910
Members of the Parliament of the United Kingdom for English constituencies
Liberal Party (UK) MPs for English constituencies
Labour Party (UK) parliamentary candidates